The People's Joker is a 2022 American queer coming-of-age parody superhero film directed by Vera Drew, and written by Drew and Bri LeRose. The movie premiered on September 13, 2022, at the 2022 Toronto International Film Festival, but planned re-screenings of the movie were canceled due to "rights issues". The movie unofficially parodies characters from the Batman comics, and the main character is a transgender woman based on the Joker, played by Drew. The film also features Scott Aukerman, Tim Heidecker, Maria Bamford, David Liebe Hart, Robert Wuhl, and Bob Odenkirk in supporting roles.

Premise 
Joker the Harlequin is a transgender woman and aspiring comedian in Gotham City. She teams up with The Penguin and enters an emotionally manipulative relationship with another transgender character called "Mr. J".

Cast 
 Vera Drew as Joker the Harlequin/Vera, a trans woman from Smallville trying to break into the world of stand-up comedy.
 Griffin Kramer as a young, pre-transition Vera, whose deadname is bleeped. 
 Lynn Downey as Vera's mother
 Kane Distler as Mr. J, an emotionally manipulative trans man who is a composite of Jason Todd and the Jared Leto incarnation of the Joker from Suicide Squad.
 Nathan Faustyn as The Penguin, Joker's slacker roommate and another aspiring comedian.
 David Liebe Hart as Ra's al Ghul, the emcee of UCB, Gotham City's only comedy showcase.
 Phil Braun as Batman, a closeted gay man with far-right politics, who was Mr. J's abuser.
 Maria Bamford as Lorne Michaels, the controlling producer of UCB. Saturday Night Live star Sarah Sherman originally voiced the role but asked to be recast following the Toronto Film Festival premiere.
 Christian Calloway as Dr. Jonathan Crane, who prescribes the young Vera with Smilex, an ineffective antidepressant with grotesque side effects.
 Trevor Drinkwater as The Riddler, another aspiring comedian.
 Ruin Carroll as Poison Ivy, a non-binary aspiring comedian.
 Tim Heidecker as Perry White, a belligerent Alex Jones-style political commentator.
 Scott Aukerman as Mr. Freeze
 Bob Odenkirk as Bob the Goon
 Arden Hughes as the UCB Computer
 Mike Vanderbilt as The Creeper
 Robert Wuhl as himself, an actor in superhero films
 Alec Robbins

Production 
In late 2019, co-writer Bri LeRose encouraged Drew to re-edit the film Joker. While working on the re-edit, Drew began to think about how the characters reflected her own life, stating "I knew I needed to do some sort of big creative project around gender, comedy, and mom issues". Drew originally planned to re-edit "every single Batman movie" along with other films to make the movie, but those scenes were later edited out. Drew crowdsourced both the budget for the production and the artwork; more than 100 artists provided backdrops and character animation for the film.

Release 
According to Drew, "a media conglomerate" sent her "an angry letter (misreported as a 'cease and desist') pressuring to not screen" shortly before the premiere. Some media outlets assumed this to be Warner Bros. Discovery, the parent company to DC Comics, but neither Drew nor Warner Bros. have confirmed this.

On September 14, 2022, a day after the film had premiered, subsequent screenings of the film were canceled. The website for TIFF stated, "The filmmaker has withdrawn this film due to rights issues". The film has attempted to receive copyright exemption under fair use for being a parody, and a title card displayed before the movie began stated "Any copyright or trademark infringement was not done intentionally", among other things. In a statement to Variety, Drew said: "We’re looking for buyers and distribution partners who will protect us and make this film accessible to trans people and their families everywhere".

On September 21, Drew also pulled the film from other film festivals where it had been slated to screen, although it was unclear whether this was motivated by another copyright infringement threat or simply to help the film gain a distribution deal.

Reception 
Peter Debruge of Variety described the movie as "reflect[ing] the deliberately outrageous, ironically distanced variety found in internet memes and Adult Swim series" and as "using millennial meta-irony ... to critique the institutions [Drew] once held dear". Katie Rife of Polygon stated, "in an age where corporate IP has become a de facto religion in global cinema culture, The People’s Joker is a blasphemous Molotov cocktail of a movie, with a unique and valuable point of view. And it’s hilarious, too". Jude Dry of IndieWire gave it a B+ and wrote: "Underneath the satirical madness lies a genuinely moving story of self-acceptance, self-love, and the inspiring act of an artist stepping into her power. All jokes aside, the people deserve to see it."

References

External links
 
 

Films about trans women
2022 comedy films
American parody films
American comedy films
2022 LGBT-related films
American LGBT-related films
LGBT-related comedy films
Crowdfunded films
Fan films based on Batman
Joker (character)
Film controversies in the United States
Film controversies in Canada